The Mathrubhumi International Festival of Letters (MBIFL) is an annual literary festival that takes place in the Indian city of Thiruvananthapuram, Kerala.

History and organisation

Founding
It was founded in 2018 and is organised by the Mathrubhumi newspaper group. The Festival Director is Sabin Iqbal.

2018 and 2019 editions
The inaugural edition of the festival happened over three days from 2 February to 4 February 2018. Owing to the good response, the second edition of the festival was extended by a day and it took place from 31 January to 3 February 2019.

2020 edition
In 2019 it was announced that a "Book of the Year" Literary Award "to honour and celebrate the best in Indian literature", would be presented for the first time at the 2020 festival, with a cash prize of Rs 5 lakh being given to the best work of fiction published in English. 

The third edition of the festival took place from 30 January to 2 February 2020, with the theme "Shrinking Spaces, Transcending letters" and featuring some 350 speakers from India and around the world. Notable participants, representing leading Indian writers as well as some 40 names from abroad, included Lemn Sissay, Margaret Busby, Dean Atta, Alexander McCall Smith, Tatenda Taibu, Romesh Gunesekera, Shashi Tharoor and M. T. Vasudevan Nair, with discussions taking place on a wide range of topics covering all aspects of arts and culture, gender, politics, sports, and other topics. 

In 2020, the inaugural "Book of the Year" award was presented, the winner being Vinod Kumar Shukla's Blue is Like Blue, translated into English by Arvind Krishna Mehrotra and Sara Rai.

In the four days over which the 2020 edition of MBIFL was held, more than 6000 people attended the events.

References

Literary festivals in India
Malayalam-language literature
Annual events in India
Culture of Thiruvananthapuram